The Lilliput Press is an Irish publishing house, founded in 1984 by Antony Farrell.  Since its inception, Lilliput has published over 600 titles, ranging from art and architecture, autobiography and memoir, biography and history, ecology and environmentalism, to essays and literary criticism, philosophy, current affairs and popular culture, fiction, drama and poetry. Among its authors is Irish poet-philosopher John Moriarty, described in The Irish Times as "The greatest Irish thinker you’ve never read".

References

External links
 Official website

Book publishing companies of Ireland
Publishing companies established in 1984